Franz Burkard (died 1539) was a canon lawyer in Ingolstadt who opposed Lutheranism, particularly in the trial of Andreas Seehofer.

References

Canon law jurists
1539 deaths
Year of birth unknown
16th-century German lawyers